The 1936 Cork Senior Hurling Championship was the 48th staging of the Cork Senior Hurling Championship since its establishment by the Cork County Board in 1887. The draw for the opening round fixtures took place at the Cork Convention on 26 January 1936. The championship began on 15 March 1936 and ended on 13 September 1936.

Glen Rovers were the defending champions.

On 13 September 1936, Glen Rovers won the championship following a 7-5 to 4-2 defeat of Sarsfields in the final. This was their third championship title and the third of eight successive championships.

Team changes

To Championship

Promoted from the Cork Intermediate Hurling Championship
 Ballincollig

From Championship

Regraded to the Cork Intermediate Hurling Championship
 Nemo Rangers

Declined to field a team
 Avondhu
 Muskerry

Results

First round

Second round

Sarsfields received a bye in this round.

Semi-finals

Final

Championship statistics

Miscellaneous

 The first round match between Blackrock and St. Finbarr's was declared void and a replay ordered after the second half of the match ended early.

References

Cork Senior Hurling Championship
Cork Senior Hurling Championship